Iurii Bozhynskyi (born 16 May 1992) is a Ukrainian Paralympic swimmer. He represented Ukraine at the 2016 Summer Paralympics in Rio de Janeiro, Brazil and he won two medals: the silver medal in the men's 4 × 100 m medley relay 34pts event and the bronze medal in the men's 50 m freestyle S8 event.

He also won the bronze medal in the men's 4×100 metre freestyle relay 34pts event at the 2020 Summer Paralympics held in Tokyo, Japan.

References

External links 
 

Living people
1992 births
Ukrainian male freestyle swimmers
Paralympic swimmers of Ukraine
Paralympic medalists in swimming
Paralympic silver medalists for Ukraine
Paralympic bronze medalists for Ukraine
Swimmers at the 2016 Summer Paralympics
Swimmers at the 2020 Summer Paralympics
Medalists at the 2016 Summer Paralympics
Medalists at the 2020 Summer Paralympics
Medalists at the World Para Swimming European Championships
Place of birth missing (living people)
S8-classified Paralympic swimmers
21st-century Ukrainian people